The Services of Supply or "SOS" branch of the Army of the USA was created on 28 February 1942 by Executive Order Number 9082 "Reorganizing the Army and the War Department" and War Department Circular No. 59, dated 2 March 1942. Services of Supply became one of the three autonomous components of the Army of the United States on 9 March 1942. It was renamed the Army Service Forces on 12 March 1943, as it was felt that the term "supply" did not accurately describe its broad range of activities.  From the day of inception (and even before) in 1942 through the end of WWII, the SOS/ASF was commanded by Lieutenant General (later General) Brehon B. Somervell.

Most theaters of war had their own logistical organization, usually also named the Services of Supply. The European Theater, and its SOS was subdivided into the ETO and the MTO (Mediterranean Theater of Operations) for the Operation Torch invasion of North Africa, then Sicily, then Italy, though the MTO was largely supplied by the SOS out of Great Britain.  The SOS-ETO became TSF/ET (Theater Service Forces—European Theater) on D-Day, 6 June 1944, the term SOS was abolished, and its activities on the continent were referred to as COM-Z, or Communications Zone.

Southwest Pacific Area
United States Army Services of Supply, Southwest Pacific Area (USASOS SWPA) in the South West Pacific Area were a direct outgrowth of the U.S. Army Forces in Australia (USAFIA), formed from command elements arriving in Australia with the Pensacola Convoy. They were commanded by Brigadier General Richard J. Marshall, and later Brigadier General J. L. Frink from September 1943. They were abolished in April 1945, and absorbed into Army Forces, Western Pacific (AFWESPAC).

European Theater
The Services of Supply, European Theater of Operations (ETO), was established in Cheltenham, England on 24 May 1942 under the command of Major General John C. H. Lee. Almost two years of build up followed, supporting the North African Campaign and eventually the Invasion of Normandy. The command was redesignated COMZ (Communications Zone) after the 6 June 1944 invasion. Within COMZ was ADSEC (the Advance Section, Communications Zone) and FECOMZ (Forward Echelon, Communications Zone).  This command was divided in the fall of 1942 to include service and supply functions in the North African Theater of Operations to support the Operation Torch invasion of North Africa, and the subsequent invasions of Sicily, Italy, and southern France.  Lee's deputy, Brigadier General Thomas B. Larkin, was spun off from the SOS-ETO to direct this effort for the duration of the war, ending the conflict with the title Commanding General, Army Service Forces, Mediterranean Theater of Operations. The development of telecommunications infrastructure in the region of Cheltenham was one of the major reasons why the GCHQ was moved to the town after American operations ceased.

See also 
 Office of Naval Material

Citations

General references 

 
 
 

Military units and formations of the United States Army in World War II